</ref></ref>

Stefan Diez (born 1971 in Freising) is a German industrial designer whose Munich-based studio, DIEZ OFFICE, develops furniture, accessories, and exhibition designs.

Early life and education 

Born in 1971 in Freising, Germany, to a family of "4th-generation carpenters", Diez had grown up around carpentry and cabinetmaking, which influenced his design. His introduction to furniture design started in 1991 when he worked as a cabinetmaker for three years. After spending a year working in Mumbai and Poona, India, Diez returned to Germany in 1996.

He matriculated at the State Academy of Fine Arts Stuttgart, where he earned a Bachelor's of Industrial Design in 2002 while studying under the likes of Richard Sapper.

Career 

Before founding his own design studio DIEZ OFFICE in January 2003, Diez worked for Richard Sapper and then Konstantin Grcic. Since then, he has worked in various fields of design ranging from furniture and tableware to industrial design, as well as exhibition design for companies like Brunner, e15, Gandiablasco, HAY, Herman Miller, Magis, Midgard, Moroso, Rosenthal, Thonet, Vibia, Wilkhahn, Wagner and others. Diez's "Upon Bench" debuted at imm Cologne in 2007 to critical acclaim. His  Model No. 404 chair was influenced by the work of Michael Thonet, and is produced by Thonet. Many of his products have received international design awards, including the “Designpreis der Bundesrepublik Deutschland”, the “IF Gold award”, and the "Red Dot: Best of the Best".

Starting in 2007, Diez started teaching at the Karlsruhe University of Arts and Design and in 2015 he joined the faculty of Lund University's School of Industrial Design in Lund, Sweden. Since 2018, he has served as the Head of Industrial Design at the University of Applied Arts Vienna.

Sustainability 
He considers "circular design" to be a key principle of his product design philosophy and "his products put forward a sustainable approach that combines multiplicity of use with superior durability". In fact, his AYNO lamp, designed for Midgard, received the 2021 German Sustainability Award.

Selected works 

 MUDRA for BRUNNER chair family 2022
 PLUSMINUS for VIBIA lighting system 2022 
 4th WALL with VIBIA AND MANY OTHERS temporary installation 2021-2022
 COSTUME for MAGIS modular sofa 2021
 MOD for SAMMODE lighting system 2021
 AYNO for MIDGARD lighting family 2020
 SHIRO for SCHÖNWALD tableware 2019
 HOUDINI 10 YEARS for E15 wooden chair family 2019
 D1 for WAGNER office chair collection
 FALLSTAFF for DANTE armchair 2018
 NEW ORDER for HAY furniture system 
 404 for THONET chair

Selected awards

2022 

 2022 AW Designer of the year

2021 

 The Good Design Gold Award for Costume by MAGIS
 German Design award 2022 for D2 by Wagner
 Archiproducts Design Awards for Costume by MAGIS with special mention for sustainability

2020 

 Deutscher Nachhaltigkeitspreis – The National German Sustainability Award 2020 for AYNO by Midgard
 German Design Award in Gold 2020 for SHIRO by Schönwald
 German Design Award 2020, Excellent Product Design, for RGB by Burgbad

2019 

 2019 Wallpaper Design Award für Pendelleuchte „Guise“
 2019 Architectural Digest The Cleverest Awards 2019 for RGB by Burgbad

2018 

 2018 Red Dot Best of the Best Award für Stuhl „D1“

 Interior Innovation Award imm Cologne, winner of the „best of the best award” for the product „D1” by Wagner
 German Design Award 2018 winner for the product „GUISE“ by Vibia
 Red Dot Best of the Best Award 2018 for the product”GUISE” by Vibia

2016 

 Red Dot Best of the Best Award für Kaminofen „Logastyle Lucrum“
 German Design Award 2016 for the project “LOGASTYLE LUCRUM” by Buderus

2015 

 Red Dot Award 2015, for the product „YARD” Lounge chair by EMU
 Wallpaper* Design Award, Best grid for the product „YARD” Armchair by EMU

2011 

 2011 2 × Red Dot Best of the Best Award für „Chassis“ und „Homme“

2007 

 2007 Materialica Design & Technology Award

2006 

 Designpreis der Bundesrepublik Deutschland in Silber (2006) für sein für Thomas gestaltetes Oven-to-table Programm (feuerfestes Geschirr)

2004 

 interior innovation award der internationalen Möbelmesse imm cologne (2004)
 Internationaler Designpreis Baden-Württemberg, GER (2004) »Genio« + »Tema«
 Die Gute Industrieform / iF, GER (2004) »Genio« + »Tema«

2002 

 Bayerischer Staatspreis für Nachwuchsdesigner (2002)
 Design Report Award (2002)

Selected publications 

 Archiproducts
 Baunetz
 NOMAD MAGAZINE 
 AW Designer of the year 2022 
 DAMN MAGAZINE
 Goethe Institut

References 

1971 births
Living people
People from Freising
German industrial designers